John Rosel Hunter (born August 16, 1965) is a former American football offensive tackle who played in the National Football League for four seasons. He played college football at BYU and was drafted by the Minnesota Vikings in the third round of the 1989 NFL Draft.

Professional career

Minnesota Vikings
Hunter was selected by the Minnesota Vikings in the third round of the 1989 NFL Draft, but never saw action as a member of the team.

Atlanta Falcons
Hunter signed with the Atlanta Falcons for the final four games of the 1989 season. The next season, Hunter started the first three games of the season, but suffered a hip injury; he missed one game and spent the rest of the season as a reserve. In 1991, Hunter played just two games, spending most of the season on injured reserve.

Seattle Seahawks
In the 1992 season, Hunter played in five games for the Seattle Seahawks, starting three games.

References

External links
 Pro Football Archives bio

1965 births
Living people
Sportspeople from Roseburg, Oregon
Sportspeople from Oregon
Players of American football from Oregon
American football offensive tackles
BYU Cougars football players
Atlanta Falcons players
Seattle Seahawks players
People from Roseburg, Oregon